State Excise Academy & Research Centre (SEARC) is situated in Poothole in Thrissur city, Kerala, India. The academy trains the entire staff of Kerala Excise department, and gives a centralized training for Kerala State Excise personals. It also runs basic training and in-service courses for various ranks. Earlier, the excise staff used to train at the Kerala Police Academy at Ramavarmapuram.

References

Custom and excise duties in India
State agencies of Kerala
Education in Thrissur
Organisations based in Thrissur
Science and technology in Thrissur
Government agencies established in 2008
2008 establishments in Kerala